Rachel Yakar (born 3 March 1938) is a French soprano.

Yakar was born in Lyon, France.  She studied under Germaine Lubin at the Paris Conservatoire. In 1963, she made her debut at Strasbourg. For the next twenty years, she was associated with the Deutsche Oper am Rhein in Düsseldorf. In the mid and late 1970s, she performed at Bayreuth, Glyndebourne, Edinburgh, Salzburg and Covent Garden. Her repertory included Mozart's Donna Elvira from Don Giovanni, and First Lady from The Magic Flute; Monteverdi's L'incoronazione di Poppea and Rameau's Aricia; Jean-Baptiste Lully's Climène from Phaëton, Leclair's Circé in Scylla et Glaucus; Arthur Honegger's Diane from Les aventures du roi Pausole and Francis Poulenc's Madame Lidoine from Dialogues of the Carmelites.

References
Grove Music Online (Requires subscription)
 

Musicians from Lyon
French operatic sopranos
Living people
1938 births
Conservatoire de Paris alumni
20th-century French women opera singers